The Par River is a river of Arunachal Pradesh in the northeast of the Republic of India.
Its main tributaries are the Pang and Nimte rivers.
It joins the Subansiri River(where?)  and thus eventually the Brahmaputra.

See also
Puroik people

References
Dams, Rivers & People Monthly, February 2005.
Arunachal Pradesh District Gazetteers: Subansiri district, Gazetteer of India, 1981, p. 7.

Rivers of Arunachal Pradesh
Rivers of India